Barbie: Magic Genie Adventure is a single-player adventure/action game developed by Vicarious Visions and published by Mattel Interactive. It was released on the Game Boy Color on November 11, 2000.

Plot
The plot is that "an evil genie named Kardal has stolen the magic lamps from four of Barbie's friends. As Barbie, players attempt to recover the lamps by visiting five mystical cities" "filled with mystery and danger as you gather magic powers and abilities to help you on your journey" Then, "once Barbie has found all four lamps, she'll need to confront Kardal from inside his palace".

Gameplay
Scott Alan Marriott of All Game Guide explains the gameplay: "Each activity is a mini-game played on one of three difficulty levels. By playing an activity on a harder setting, players can unlock new carpets or the ability to cast spells. Activities alternate between action sequences and puzzles."

The game came with a 28-page Instruction Manual, featured three difficulty settings, and progress was able to be resumed via passwords.

Critical reception
Nintendo Power gave the game a rating of 6.6/10. AllGameGuide gave the game a rating of 2.5/5 stars.

References

External links
 
 

2000 video games
Action-adventure games
North America-exclusive video games
Magic Genie Adventure
Game Boy Color games
Game Boy Color-only games
Video games based on Arabian mythology
Video games developed in the United States
Vicarious Visions games
Single-player video games